Roberto Cobelo (born 31 October 1962) is a former Argentine rugby union player. He played as a lock.

Career
Cobelo spent all of his club career at Club Atlético San Isidro. He was first capped for Argentina in a match against Uruguay, in Santiago, on 27 September 1987. He was called up in the Argentina 1987 Rugby World Cup squad, but did not play any match in the tournament. His last cap for Argentina was against Chile, in Santiago, on 3 October 1987.

Notes

External links

1962 births
Living people
Argentine rugby union players
Rugby union locks
Argentina international rugby union players